City Guys is an American television sitcom that aired for five seasons on NBC from September 6, 1997, to December 15, 2001. The series aired as part of the network's Saturday morning block, TNBC.

Plot
City Guys was mainly centered on its two main characters, Jamal Grant (Wesley Jonathan) and Chris Anderson (Scott Whyte), two teenagers from different backgrounds – Chris coming from a wealthy family, and Jamal coming from a working-class family – who had to stay on the ball while attending Manhattan High School (which was nicknamed in the series as "Manny High") and avoid trouble, while their principal Karen Noble (Marcella Lowery) attempted to keep them in line and out of trouble. Jamal and Chris's similar personalities caused friction between them in the beginning, but they became best friends as the series went on. The boys and their friends – overachiever Dawn Tartikoff (Caitlin Mowrey), slick guy Al Ramos (Dion Basco), aspiring actress Cassidy Giuliani (Marissa Dyan) and dimwitted bully-turned-friend (who was held back six grades) Lionel "L-Train" Johnson (Steven Daniel) – dealt with the typical teen issues, such as cheating on tests, peer pressure, racism, and dealing with school violence.

Cast
 Wesley Jonathan as Jamal Abdul Grant
 Scott Whyte as Christopher Robert "Chris" Anderson
 Caitlin Mowrey as Dawn Tartikoff
 Dion Basco as Alberto (Al) "Rocket" Ramos
 Marissa Dyan as Cassidy Giuliani
 Steven Daniel as Lionel "L-Train" Johnson
 Marcella Lowery as Principal Karen Coretta Noble

Theme music
The theme song for City Guys was written by Joey Schwartz, Eric Swerdloff and Michael Muta-Ali Muhammad and composed by Joey Schwartz (who also composed the incidental music used to denote scene changes and breaks in the program). The rap and R&B-infused theme included a chorus, "C-I-T-Y you can see why, these guys, the neat guys, smart and streetwise", which repeating twice consecutively during the beginning, middle and near the end of the song.

Episodes

Series overview

Season 1 (1997)

Season 2 (1998)

Season 3 (1999–2000)

Season 4 (2000–01)

Season 5 (2001)

Syndication
City Guys ran in syndication on local television stations throughout the United States from September 10, 2001 to September 13, 2002, Tribune Entertainment, which distributed the series (its corporate sister at the time, Tribune Broadcasting, incidentally, was the primary station group carrying the series), sold the series as a syndication package–alongside fellow TNBC sitcom California Dreams–for stations to count towards educational programming guidelines set by the Federal Communications Commission. The series later briefly aired on BET for three weeks from October 2, 2010 to October 16, 2010.

As of 2022, City Guys–as well as fellow TNBC sitcom One World–is available for streaming on Tubi.

References

External links 
 Official Website
 

1990s American high school television series
1990s American black sitcoms
1990s American teen sitcoms
1997 American television series debuts
2000s American high school television series
2000s American black sitcoms
2000s American teen sitcoms
1990s American sitcoms
2000s American sitcoms
2001 American television series endings
Dyslexia in fiction
English-language television shows
NBC original programming
Television series about teenagers
Television series by Tribune Entertainment
Television shows set in Manhattan
Television series by Universal Television